United States Navy Explosive Ordnance Disposal technicians render safe all types of ordnance, including improvised, chemical, biological, and nuclear. They perform land and underwater location, identification, render-safe, and recovery (or disposal) of foreign and domestic ordnance. They conduct demolition of hazardous munitions, pyrotechnics, and retrograde explosives using detonation and burning techniques. They forward deploy and fully integrate with the various Combatant Commanders, Special Operations Forces (SOF), and various warfare units within the Navy, Marine Corps, Air Force and Army. They are also called upon to support military and civilian law enforcement agencies, as well as the Secret Service.

EOD Technicians' missions take them to all environments, and every climate, in every part of the world. They have many assets available to arrive to their mission, from open- and closed-circuit scuba and surface supplied diving rigs, to parachute insertion from fixed-wing aircraft and fast-rope, abseil, and Special Patrol Insertion/Extraction (SPIE) from rotary aircraft, to small boats and tracked vehicles.

History
Navy Explosive Ordnance Disposal teams trace their history back to the first group of volunteers selected to work with the famed British UXO teams, following the initial German Blitzkrieg attacks in early 1940. In June 1941, these veterans returned to form the first class in what was originally named the Mine Recovery School. Officers and enlisted personnel entered the eleven-week school, qualifying as Mine Recovery Personnel/Second Class Divers. Between June 1941 and October 1945, nineteen classes graduated and deployed throughout the Pacific and Mediterranean theaters. Divided into Mobile Explosive Investigative Units (MEIU) they were instrumental in the clearance of explosive hazards both on land and at sea. The Korean War saw a return to action on various minesweepers ensuring the continual clearance of shipping hazards. Additionally, the now renamed Explosive Ordnance Disposal (EOD) Units took part in inland intelligence operations and interacted with ground-based units in Inchon, Wonson and throughout the United Nations Theater of operations.

The Vietnam War saw an increase in overall participation by EOD units. Units from EOD Group Pacific, Pearl Harbor, Hawaii deployed throughout the region. EODGRUPAC was composed of Mobile Unit, Shipboard Unit and Training and Evaluation Unit personnel. Deployed teams on board ships at sea were composed of one officer and two enlisted men. Teams in-country were larger and were based from the Mekong Delta (RIVFLOT 1) to DaNang.  With an overall emphasis in sea and riverine mine clearance operations, these teams ensured the continued safety for shipping and maritime operations.

Since the close of the Vietnam War, the changing world situation and increased operational tasking have prompted the expansion of EOD units in number, size and capabilities. Their record in recent history includes the Gulf War where EOD Technicians cleared in excess of 500 naval mines. EOD was the critical element in eliminating unexploded ordnance from the  after two Exocet anti-ship missiles fired from an Iraqi aircraft hit her. EOD developed render safe procedures on-site to prevent a catastrophe. During joint operations in Somalia, Haiti, Bosnia, and Kosovo, EOD provided safety and operational continuity by eliminating booby traps, weapons caches, and performing mine clearance operations. EOD units are presently serving in Afghanistan and Iraq where they are supporting the global war against terrorism, destroying tons of post war ordnance and reducing the threat imposed by Improvised Explosive Devices (IED) that have plagued both countries. Forward deployed and fully integrated within the various Special Operations units within the U.S. Navy and Army, the present day EOD technician has changed greatly from that first Mine Recovery class of 1941. But one thing that has never changed is the level of professionalism and dedication that has been the cornerstone of the program.

Training

The EOD training pipeline starts with three weeks of preparatory training at Naval Station Great Lakes, Illinois. The candidate will work on swim stroke development, long range swims and physical conditioning. EOD candidates will then attend an additional 51 weeks of rigorous training. Their training starts with nine weeks of dive school held at the Naval Diving and Salvage Training Center (NDSTC) in Panama City, Florida. Besides learning how to dive, candidates learn about the various kinds of equipment and dive physics. After successful completion of dive school, candidates transfer to Naval Explosive Ordnance Disposal School at Eglin Air Force Base in Fort Walton Beach, Florida. This training is broken down into specific types of ordnance:

 Demolition Division
 Includes how to set up various explosive firing trains
 Tools & Methods Division
 Teaches you the various tools and methods of EOD work
 Core Division
 Teaches fundamentals of EOD work
 Ground Ordnance Division
 Focuses on projected munitions and grenades
 Air Ordnance Division
 Focuses on bombs and missiles
 Improvised Explosive Device
 Includes "homemade bombs”
 Bio/Chem Division
 Includes lessons on various biological and chemical agents
 Nuclear Ordnance Division
 Covers basic nuclear physics and radiation monitoring and decontamination procedures
Underwater Ordnance Division
 Emphasizes torpedoes and other underwater explosives as well as underwater search techniques

Every section teaches how to render-safe or defuse ordnance.

Upon completion of basic EOD training, all graduates will attend the three-week Basic Airborne Course at Fort Benning, Georgia where candidates qualify as a basic parachutist.

After Jump School, training continues at Gulfport, Mississippi, for an additional four weeks, consisting of weapons training in the use of the 9mm handgun and the M-4 carbine as well as combat first aid.

The final phase of EOD training is three weeks of EOD Tactical Training at the Naval Amphibious Base in San Diego. This will consist of helicopter insertion (fast-rope, rappel, cast and SPIE), small arms/weapons training, small unit tactics (weapons, self-defense, land navigation, and patrolling), and tactical communications (satellite and high frequency). Upon completion of the EOD training, graduates are assigned to EOD Mobile Units where they gain advanced on-the-job training and experience as members of Combat Expeditionary Support (CES) platoons/companies, Carrier and Expeditionary Strike Group platoons, SOF Companies, and Marine Mammal Companies.

Officer training

Officer training for the EOD career field (119x / 114x) differs slightly. Their pipeline is as follows:
 EOD Junior Officer Course (7 days, Naval Diving and Salvage Training Center) – This course trains junior officers in EOD group, mobile unit, and detachment/small unit organization to include organizational relationships with detachments/small units, small group dynamics, CPO/OIC relationships, ethics, and EOD case studies.
 Diver Training (60 days, Naval Diving and Salvage Training Center) – Designed to provide qualified non-diving personnel with the basic training necessary to safely and effectively perform as a dive team member/diver in SCUBA and MK-16 UBA in accordance with the U.S. Navy Diving Manual.
 EOD School (320 days, Naval School Explosive Ordnance Disposal) (see enlisted training)
 Basic Airborne (23 days, Fort Benning) (see enlisted training)
 Expeditionary Combat Skills (27 days, Center for Security Forces)
 EOD Tactical Training (21 days, EOD Training and Evaluation Unit ONE, San Diego) (See enlisted training)
 EOD Platoon Leader Course (12 days)

Advanced training opportunities include foreign language, Advanced Improvised Explosive Device Disposal, and Department of Energy training.

Advanced equipment
EOD employs a variety of tools, techniques, and procedures (TTPs) to accomplish the mission. Robots are used to perform remote procedures on unexploded ordnance and improvised explosive devices.  Efforts to maintain the latest technology are accomplished with the assistance and the DoE and various civilian organizations. Johns Hopkins University maintains the Advanced Explosive Ordnance Disposal Robotic System (AEODRS) program.  The primary goal of AEODRS is to develop a common architecture for a family of unmanned ground vehicle (UGV) systems to enable unprecedented levels of interoperability. AEODRS is a Joint Service Explosive Ordnance Disposal (JSEOD) program, executed through the Naval Explosive Ordnance Disposal Technology Division (NAVEODTECHDIV) via the Navy Program Management Office for Explosive Ordnance Disposal/Counter Remote Controlled Improvised Explosive Device Electronic Warfare (PMS-408).

Units

Explosive Ordnance Disposal (EOD) Group One
Naval Amphibious Base Coronado, California
 EOD Mobile Unit ONE, Naval Base Point Loma, California
 EOD Mobile Unit THREE, Naval Amphibious Base Coronado, California
 EOD Mobile Unit FIVE, Naval Base Guam
 EOD Mobile Unit ELEVEN, Imperial Beach, California
 EOD Training and Evaluation Unit (TEU) ONE, Naval Base Point Loma, California
 Mobile Diving and Salvage Unit (MDSU) ONE, Pearl Harbor, Hawaii
 EOD Expeditionary Support Unit One, Naval Amphibious Base Coronado, California
 EOD Operational Support Unit SEVEN, Naval Amphibious Base Coronado, California (decommissioned)

Explosive Ordnance Disposal (EOD) Group Two
Naval Amphibious Base Little Creek, Virginia
 EOD Mobile Unit TWO, Naval Amphibious Base Little Creek, Virginia
 EOD Mobile Unit SIX, Naval Amphibious Base Little Creek, Virginia
 EOD Mobile Unit EIGHT, Naval Station Rota Spain, Spain
 EOD Mobile Unit TWELVE, Naval Amphibious Base Little Creek, Virginia
 EOD Expeditionary Support Unit TWO, Naval Amphibious Base Little Creek, Virginia
 EOD Training and Evaluation Unit (TEU) TWO, Joint Expeditionary Base East, Virginia
 Mobile Diving and Salvage Unit (MDSU) TWO, Naval Amphibious Base Little Creek, Virginia

Expeditionary Exploitation Unit ONE, Indian Head, Maryland

See also
 
 
 
  (British Army)

References

External links 
 Official USN EOD Career Description
 Info on Navy EOD from the Navy's Expeditionary Force Command
 Naval Expeditionary Combat Command – EOD Description
 Navy EOD Training
 Stew Smith – Navy EOD Training
 Discovery Channel on US Navy EOD Training
 US Navy EOD Training and Advancement

Bomb disposal
Armed forces diving
Explosive ordnance disposal units and formations
Military units and formations of the United States Navy
United States Navy ratings